Nottingham is the seventh largest conurbation in the United Kingdom. Despite this, the city had a poor transport system in the 1980s. The government has in the early twenty-first century invested heavily in the transport network of Nottingham, which has led to the re-opening of the Robin Hood Line and the construction of a light rail network, Nottingham Express Transit.

Rail

History
The first railway station in Nottingham opened in 1839. It was opened by the Midland Counties Railway and was built on Carrington Street. It was served by trains to Derby. By 1848, the station was too small and a new through station was built in Nottingham by the Midland Railway (which was formed when the Midland Counties Railway merged with two other companies). New destinations such as Lincoln received direct service to Nottingham.

In 1900, the Manchester, Sheffield and Lincolnshire Railway opened Nottingham Victoria station, as part of their new line to London which they were building. The station was served by Great Central services to Marylebone station in London. The Great Northern Railway also used the station.

In 1904, the Midland Railway closed their station in Nottingham and opened a new one, Nottingham Midland station, which is still open today.

In 1967, Nottingham Victoria Station became run down and the station suffered from a lack of services. A familiar situation occurred on the lines coming out of the station such as the Great Central Main Line, so the station and Main line were closed. Nottingham Arkwright Street railway station, also on the Great Central main line, closed in 1969.

The Robin Hood Line from Nottingham to Worksop, Nottinghamshire was closed to passengers following the Beeching cuts in the 1960s, and reopened to passengers in stages between 1993 and 1998.

Current services

There are currently services from Nottingham operated by East Midlands Railway to London, Leeds, Sheffield, Liverpool, York, Doncaster and Scarborough. Most trains run on the Midland Main Line. East Midlands Railway also operate local services. CrossCountry operate services to Cardiff via Birmingham and Bristol. The station has been redeveloped with more shops and Nottingham Express Transit trams running over the top of the station.

Future developments
There are plans to bring High Speed 2 rail services to Nottingham and the East Midlands by constructing a parkway station (called the East Midlands Hub) at Toton.

Trams

History

The Nottingham and District Tramways Company Limited began operating horse-drawn trams in Nottingham in 1878. A steam tram service began in 1880. In 1898, the Nottingham Corporation Tramways took over the existing tramways. Electric trams were introduced from 1901, and the last horse tram ran in 1902. The tram network in Nottingham was replaced between 1926 and 1936 by a combination of the Nottingham trolleybus system and a fleet of motor buses.

Nottingham Express Transit

Nottingham Express Transit (NET) is a light-rail system. The first line opened on 9 March 2004, having cost £200 million to construct. The scheme took 16 years from conception to implementation. There are currently two lines, with a total of four destinations: Hucknall and Phoenix Park in the north, and Clifton and Beeston in the south. The Hucknall line runs parallel to the Robin Hood Line. Tickets can be bought at tram stops.

Roads
Nottingham is close to the M1 motorway and major roads the A52 and the A46. To the west of Nottingham through to Derby, the A52 is known as Brian Clough Way. There are several park and ride locations which offer connections with Nottingham Express Transit or the bus network.

Workplace parking levy
In April 2012, Nottingham became the first city in the UK to introduce a workplace parking levy. The levy charges businesses for each parking space made available to employees at businesses with more than ten such parking spaces. The council have used the revenue of around £10 million a year to develop the city's tram system. The levy for the period 1 April 2020 31 March 2021 is £424 per space. As of 2019, there was a 9% reduction in automobile traffic and 15% increase in public transport use since the introduction of the levy.

Cycling
Nottingham benefits from a network of traffic free cycle routes, these include:
 The Derby-Sheffield section of Route 6 of the National Cycle Network passes by University of Nottingham, Queen's Medical Centre continuing on through Wollaton and Bulwell. 
 Route 15 of the National Cycle Network from Nottingham to Sleaford starts from Trent Bridge and passes by Holme Pierrepont National Watersports Centre, continuing on through Radcliffe on Trent and Bingham.
The Big Track is a circular cycle route which follows the tow paths of the River Trent, Beeston Canal and Nottingham Canal. 

National Cycle Routes passing through Nottingham are maintained by volunteers from Sustrans. Cyclists in the Nottingham area are represented by Pedals (The Nottingham Cycling Campaign).

A new cycle and pedestrian bridge is being built over the River Trent to connect cycling routes on each side of the river.

Air
East Midlands Airport in Leicestershire, served by low-cost international airlines, makes the city easily accessible from other parts of the world providing daily services to many principal European destinations such as Paris, Milan, Frankfurt, Berlin, Oslo and Amsterdam, internal flights to Edinburgh and Belfast and limited services to transcontinental destinations such as Barbados, Mexico and Sanford, Florida. Nearby Robin Hood Airport Doncaster Sheffield also provides domestic European and transatlantic services. Birmingham Airport is about one hour's drive away and 1 hour and 30 minutes on the train, providing flights to most principal European cities, New York, Boston, Toronto, Montreal, Dubai and the Indian sub-continent.

Bus

Bus usage in Nottingham is increasing. Nottingham City Transport (NCT) operate the majority of bus services in the city. NCT was the first transport operator in the UK to use RFID technology for its EasyRider bus passes, introduced in 2000.

Trent Barton operate some local services around Nottingham and to other towns such as Beeston, Mansfield and Derby.

The two operators are also frequent winners of the National Bus Operator of the Year award. NCT and Trent Barton have a good relationship and routes are designed so they are not competing against each other. Using a Kangaroo day ticket makes it possible to use buses from both operators in a single day.

There are two bus stations in the city centre, the Broadmarsh bus station in the Broadmarsh centre (currently demolished and being rebuilt) and Victoria bus station behind the Victoria Centre.

Victoria Bus Station

Victoria Bus Station is situated within the Victoria Centre, at the northern edge of Nottingham City Centre.

Trent Barton manages the bus station's travel shop and operates routes to Derby, Hucknall, Mansfield, Chesterfield, Queen's Medical Centre, and a CentreLink bus service to Broadmarsh bus station.

Stagecoach provides a HopperBus service from Victoria Bus Station to the University of Nottingham, and Nottingham City Transport operates from nearby stops on Milton Street.

Ticketing
All operators issue single journey tickets and day tickets which can be used on all the services that operator runs. The Robin Hood day ticket allows travel on any bus, tram or local train service within the Nottingham area.

Taxis

The city has a large number of licensed taxi companies operating, usually in areas local to the office. There are also green London style Hackney Carriage taxis, which can be hailed on the street.

There are several designated taxi rank in the city centre, including at Nottingham railway station, Wheeler Gate, Victoria Centre, Broadmarsh bus station and The Corner House.

Jim Mortell of Taxi Licensing at Nottingham City Council said “The City Council has a team of uniformed late-night enforcement officers and non-uniformed enforcement officers working to detect any instances of drivers plying for hire illegally. This includes private hire drivers picking up passengers who have not pre-booked, and any drivers not licensed to work within Nottingham City.”

References

 
Nottingham
Transport in Nottinghamshire